Beth Campbell (born 1971 in Illinois, United States) is an American artist who works in drawing, sculpture, and installation.

Education
She graduated from Truman State University with a BFA in 1993, and from Ohio University with an MFA in 1997.

Career
Her works have been collected by The Museum of Modern Art, New York; New School University, New York; New Museum of Contemporary Art, New York; and the Whitney Museum of American Art, New York. 
  
Campbell was the recipient of a Guggenheim Fellowship in 2011.

She currently lives and works in Brooklyn, NY.

Exhibitions
2017
 "If (at all) possible", Kate Werble Gallery, New York, NY 
 "Beth Campbell: My Potential Future Past", The Aldrich Contemporary Art Museum, Ridgefield, CT 
2014
 Anne Mosseri-Marlio Galerie, Basel, Switzerland
 "My Potential Futures", Project Space, Joseé Bienvenu Gallery, New York, NY 
2012
 "Stereotable", Kate Werble Gallery, NY
2010
 "New Installation", The Sculpture Center, Cleveland, OH
2009
 "Without Ends", Country Club Los Angeles
 "James Harris Gallery", Seattle, WA
2008
 Nicole Klagsbrun Gallery, New York, NY
 "Social Interactions (Two-person exhibition with Stephen Willats)", Seiler + Mosseri-Marlio, Zurich, Switzerland
2007
 "Following Room", Anne & Joel Ehrenkranz Lobby Gallery, Whitney Museum of American Art, New York, NY
 "I can't quite place it", Feldman Gallery + Project Space, Pacific Northwest College of Art, Portland, OR
 "Potential Store Fronts", 125 Maiden Lane storefront, New York, NY, a project of the Public Art Fund program in the Public Realm
2005
 "How Did We End Up Here?", Nicole Klagsbrun Gallery, New York
 "Make Belief", Sala Diaz, San Antonio, TX
2004
 "Statements", Art Basel, Miami Beach, FL
 "I was thinking (a living room)", Nicole Klagsbrun Gallery, New York, NY
 "Every other day", Art Academy of Cincinnati, OH
2003
 "Same As Me", Sandroni Rey Gallery, Los Angeles, CA
2002
 "Same As Me", Roebling Hall, Brooklyn, NY
2000
 "House (A Standardized Affectation for Telepresence)", Roebling Hall, Brooklyn, NY
 "White Room", White Columns, New York, NY

Reviews

References

American artists
1971 births
Artists from Illinois
Truman State University alumni
Ohio University alumni
Living people